The Audi R8 LMS Cup was a one-make sports car racing series by Audi based in Asia. Audi R8 LMS Cup cars were based on the Audi R8 LMS (GT3).

History 

Audi R8 LMS Cup started in 2012 in all around the Asia. Constructor of this one make racing series was Audi and the tyre supplier was Michelin until the end of 2016.

2016 saw the debut of the new Audi R8 LMS car. Also in 2016, Phoenix Racing and KCMG, join Absolute Racing as Audi R8 LMS Cup service teams.

In 2017, Pirelli became the new official tyre partner for the Audi R8 LMS Cup.

2018 saw the addition of the new Audi R8 LMS GT4 to the series.

Champions Results

Race Cars

Audi R8 LMS/LMS Ultra (2012–2015)

Audi R8 LMS (2016–2018)

Audi R8 LMS Evo (2019)

Audi R8 LMS GT4 (2018–2019)

Schedule

2012

2013

2014

2015

2016

2017

2018

2019

See also
Ferrari Challenge
Lamborghini Super Trofeo
Porsche Carrera Cup
Porsche Supercup

References

External links
 

R8 LMS Cup
Asian auto racing series
Sports car racing series
One-make series
Recurring sporting events established in 2012